Charaxes (Polyura) gamma  is a butterfly in the family Nymphalidae. It was described by Percy Ireland Lathy in 1898. It is endemic to New Caledonia.

References

External links
Polyura Billberg, 1820 at Markku Savela's Lepidoptera and Some Other Life Forms

Polyura
Butterflies described in 1898